Pod Brodem  is a village in the administrative district of Gmina Ulhówek, within Tomaszów Lubelski County, Lublin Voivodeship, in eastern Poland(near the Polish-Ukrainian border).

References

Pod Brodem